Wildlife is an EP produced by British heavy metal band, Girlschool and published only in Europe. It was released in 1982 by Bronze Records as a launch for the album Screaming Blue Murder. During the recording sessions for the album, bassist and singer Enid Williams left the band and this EP is the last production made by the original formation. The songs "Don't Call It Love" and "Wildlife" were recorded again for the album with new bass player Ghislaine 'Gil' Weston and new vocal tracks. The EP was also available  in a red vinyl edition.

Track listing

Credits 
 Kim McAuliffe – rhythm guitar, vocals
 Kelly Johnson – lead guitar, vocals
 Enid Williams – bass, vocals
 Denise Dufort – drums

References

External links 
 Official Girlschool discography

1982 EPs
Girlschool EPs
Bronze Records EPs